Le Monde de l'éducation (The World of Education) is a former magazine published monthly from 1974 to 2008 by the press group Groupe La Vie-Le Monde. This magazine was a reference in the treatment of contemporary issues of the French education system. In 2008, Le Monde de l'éducation announced the end of its release. The website, however, announced it would continue as a supplement to the newspaper Le Monde.

References

External links
 Official website

1974 establishments in France
2008 disestablishments in France
Defunct magazines published in France
Education magazines
French-language magazines
Magazines established in 1974
Magazines disestablished in 2008
Magazines published in Paris
Monthly magazines published in France
Online magazines with defunct print editions
Newspaper supplements